Czech television may refer to:
Television in the Czech Republic, including a list of television channels
Czech Television, the public television broadcaster in the Czech Republic

See also
TV Nova (disambiguation)
List of Czech television programmes